Magnolia blumei is a species of magnolia that is endemic to Indonesia.

References

blumei
Endemic flora of Indonesia
Flora of Sumatra
Flora of Java
Plants described in 1888